Sola Fotballklubb is a Norwegian association football club from Sola, Rogaland.

The women's football team played in the 1. divisjon, the second tier of Norwegian football, up to and including the 2012 season, after which it resigned its place in the 1. divisjon.

The men's football team currently plays in the 3. divisjon, the fourth tier of the Norwegian football league system, after being relegated from the 2019 2. divisjon. The club played in 3. divisjon for many years, except for the years 2006, 2009 and 2013 when it had visits in the 4. divisjon. They played in the 2. divisjon from 1997 to 1999. 2015 was the first season since 1999 that the club played in the second division.

Svein Fjælberg and Gunnar Aase has played for the team. Aase also coached the men's team in 2003 together with Børre Meinseth.

Recent seasons

Source:

References

External links
 Official site 

Football clubs in Norway
Association football clubs established in 1934
Sport in Rogaland
Sola, Norway
1934 establishments in Norway